The Gschnitzbach is a river of Tyrol, Austria.

The Gschnitzbach springs from the lake  in the Stubai Alps. It flows from South to North and merges with the Sill at Steinach am Brenner.

The water quality of the Gschnitzbach is A grade and remains very clear until the mouth. It provides a good living space for fishes. The water is also used for drinking water supply for the villages nearby.

The river may look like a silent water upstream, but quickly turns into a rapid-river spiked with several dangerous chutes in its lower course.

References 

Rivers of Tyrol (state)
Rivers of Austria